2016–17 Iran Football's 2nd Division  is the 16th under 2nd Division since its establishment (current format) in 2001. The season featured 25 teams from the 2nd Division 2015–16, five new teams relegated from the 2015–16 Azadegan League: Aluminium Hormozgan, Damash, Giti Pasand, Shahrdari Ardabil, PAS Hamedan and six new teams promoted from the 3rd Division 2015–16: Shahrdari Fuman, Shahrdari Hamedan, Shahrdari Arak, Qashqai Shiraz, Shahin Mahshahr, Shahid Karimi Jooybar.

Teams

Stadia and locations

Number of teams by region

League table

Group A

Group B

Group C

Second round

Group A

Group B

2nd Division  Play-off

References

External links
 League 2 Iran | Results, Fixtures, Standings ... 

League 2 (Iran) seasons
3